Ace of Diamond is a baseball-themed manga series written and illustrated by Yuji Terajima. The series ran in Kodansha's shōnen manga magazine Weekly Shōnen Magazine from May 2006 to July 2015. The chapters were collected and published in tankōbon format by Kodansha. A total of 47 volumes was published for the series. Kodansha USA has licensed the series for an English digital release under the title Ace of the Diamond. The first English digital volume was released on 7 March 2017. As of ⁠10 January 2023, 41 volumes have been released in English.

A sequel manga, Ace of Diamond act II, was serialized in the same magazine from 19 August 2015, to 26 October 2022. The chapters are also collected and published in tankōbon by Kodansha. As of 17 February 2023, 33 volumes have been released in Japan.

Volume list

Act I

Act II

Chapters not yet in Tankōbon format 
302: 
303: 
304: 
305: 
306: 
307: 
308:

References

External links
  
 

Ace of Diamond